Piero Regnoli (1921–2001) was an Italian screenwriter and film director.

Career
Born in 1921, Regnoli worked in the film industry between 1953 and 1991 where he wrote over 110 screenplays and directed 11 films. Regnoli's work ranged from sword-and-sandal films, westerns, horror and sexy comedies. His final film where he was officially credited as a director was La principessa sul pisello in 1976. Regnoli did uncredited direction on the 1986 melodrama Giuro che ti amo starring Nino D'Angelo.

Regnoli was also employed as the film critic for the Vatican's daily newspaper L'Osservatore Romano. Regnoli died in 2001.

Style
Piero Regnoli's work as writer often dealt with themes of eroticism, such as in Brunello Rondi's Tecnica di un amore (1973), Roberto Bianchi Montero's Caligula's Hot Nights (1977) and Mario Bianchi's Satan's Baby Doll (1983). When Regnoli worked as a director, his work still contained these themes but was often toned down.

Selected filmography
Note: The films listed as N/A are not necessarily chronological.

References

Footnotes

Sources

External links

1921 births
2001 deaths
20th-century Italian screenwriters
Italian male screenwriters
Italian film directors
Italian film critics
Italian male non-fiction writers
20th-century Italian male writers